Jesse Marunde (September 14, 1979 – July 25, 2007) was an American strongman athlete who placed second in the 2005 World's Strongest Man competition. He is the brother of mixed martial artist Bristol Marunde.

Early life
Originally from Glennallen, Alaska, he later moved to Sequim, Washington. He was a high-school athlete, playing several sports, including Olympic lifting. He received an athletic scholarship to Montana State University, to play football. At age 18 he officially closed the No. 3 Captains of Crush Gripper, a hand gripper with 280 lb (127 kg) of resistance, and is the youngest person to achieve certified "Captain of Crush" status.

Strongman
In 2002, at age 22, Marunde was the youngest American ever to qualify for the 2002 World's Strongest Man. His second-place finish in 2005 made him the first American to place in the top two competitors since O.D. Wilson finished second in 1990, behind Jón Páll Sigmarsson.

Death
On July 25, 2007 Marunde died following a workout in Sequim, Washington. The cause of his death was a genetic heart defect, hypertrophic cardiomyopathy, a leading cause of sudden cardiac death in young athletes. Jesse's widow Callie Marunde is now married to professional strongman competitor Nick Best.

References

External links

Jesse Marunde's official website
Critical Bench profile

1979 births
2007 deaths
Sports deaths in Washington (state)
People from Sequim, Washington
American strength athletes
Sportspeople from Alaska